Quitters Never Win is the first full-length studio album by Much the Same.

Track listing
 "Wish" – 3:00
 "Conclusion" – 2:31
 "New Years" – 2:31
 "Liar" – 3:03
 "Masquerade" – 3:06
 "Hits Home" – 3:21
 "Quitters Never Win" – 3:14
 "One of a Kind" – 2:21
 "Miss the Pain" – 2:21
 "Someday Not Soon" – 2:18
 "Still Falling?" – 1:43
 "Father and Son" – 3:41

Personnel 
 Gunner McGrath - Lead Vocals, Guitar, Piano
 Mook Snoreck - Drums
 Franky Tsoukalas - Bass, Vocals
 Dan O'Gorman - Guitar
 Mr. Precision - Producer, Engineer, Mixing, Guitar
 Dan Wintercorn - Additional Vocals

Trivia 
 "Wish" includes a quote from the movie The Boondock Saints.

References

2003 albums
Much the Same albums
A-F Records albums